Julia Dent Grant Cantacuzène Speransky, Princess Cantacuzène, Countess Speransky (June 6, 1876 – October 4, 1975), was an American author and historian. She was the eldest child of Frederick Dent Grant and his wife Ida Marie Honoré, and the second grandchild of Ulysses S. Grant, the 18th President of the United States. In 1899, she married Prince Mikhail Cantacuzène, a Russian general and diplomat.

Princess Cantacuzène was the author of three first-person accounts of the events leading up to the Russian Revolution in 1917, as well as a personal historian of the Russian people during that time.  As the wife of a Russian nobleman, she was in a primary position to observe both the Imperial and Bolshevik positions during the Revolution.  The title of Countess Speransky has been alternatively spelled "Spéransky" and "Spiranski."

Early life
Julia Dent Grant was born at the White House on 6 June 1876.  She was the first child of Frederick Dent Grant and his wife Ida Marie Honoré (1854–1930), the daughter of Henry Honoré, of French ancestry, who made his fortune in Chicago real estate.  She was named for her grandmother, the First Lady Julia Grant née Dent.  At the time of her birth, her father  was assigned to the 4th U.S. Cavalry Regiment with the rank of lieutenant colonel.  When Julia was 5 years old, her father took a leave of absence from the Army to assist his father, the former president Grant, in writing his memoirs.

Julia had fond memories of her grandfather, who died when she was 9 years old.  Due to severe financial setbacks, her family came to live with her grandparents in Long Branch, New Jersey  and she spent the last year (1884–1885) of her grandfather's life in his home with his companionship.  Her memories of him were clearly fond ones, as she remembered the following:

My grandfather wasn't exactly gay, and I do not remember his laughing ever, but the talk between us was very interesting. He always took me seriously. I felt promoted and felt inclined to live up my position as his companion. Sometimes he would pinch my ear or my cheek and say softly, 'Julianna Johnson, don't you cry," and it rather teased me. But generally he held my pudgy dimpled hand on the palm of his, and we learned to count the fingers and dimples together; sometimes I made a mistake and sometimes he did so, letting me correct him. And he taught me "cat's cradle" with a string. We walked together hand in hand, silent frequently, but at other moments talking of our surroundings, and he called me habitually "my pet," or "my big pet," which made me very proud. I was not at all afraid of him, for he had a charming, gentle way of acting always, and though his face was generally grave, now and then a sudden gleam lighted up the eyes and made them seem to smile in answer to my chatter.

In 1889, President Benjamin Harrison appointed Julia's father as United States minister to Austria-Hungary. The Grant family traveled together to Austria-Hungary. After Grover Cleveland became president, Grant was confirmed to continue in his post in Europe. Julia made her formal début into society in Vienna, at the court of Empress Elisabeth of Austria.  Frederick Dent Grant resigned his position as US ambassador in 1893, whereupon the family returned to New York.

Marriage and family

Immediately after her father's tenure (1883–1887) as a police commissioner of the New York Police Department, Julia Dent Grant traveled to Europe in the company of her maternal aunt, Bertha Palmer (née Honoré) who was representing the Board of Lady Managers of the World's Columbian Exposition (Chicago World's Fair.)  From 1891 to 1893, aunt and niece travelled throughout Europe to promote interest in the Exposition as well as to collect art.  Julia met Prince Mikhail Cantacuzène, who was attached to the Russian embassy in Rome. Prince Michael (or Mikhail) was Prince Mikhail Cantacuzène, son of Prince Mikhail Rodionovich Cantacuzène and Elizabeth Siscard, was born on 29 April 1875 in Odessa, Russia.  He was a distant relative of Grigorii L'vovich Kantakuzen, who was the Russian representative to the U.S. from 1892 to 1895.  Two weeks after their first meeting in Rome, Prince Cantacuzène followed Julia to Cannes, ostensibly to serve under Grand Duke Kyrill.  After a courtship of two days, the couple became engaged in Cannes, then embarked upon four months of wedding preparation, during which time they were separated.  The couple married at Beaulieu, an Astor home which her aunt Bertha Palmer had leased for the summer season, in Newport, Rhode Island, in a small, private Russian Orthodox ceremony the evening of  24 September 1899.  The following day at noon there was an Episcopal Church wedding service in All Saints' Memorial Chapel, Newport.

Prince and Princess Cantacuzène resided in St. Petersburg (later Petrograd) or at their estate in Ukraine during their early married years, with the Princess giving birth to their three children, Mikhail Mikhailovich, Barbara or "Bertha" Mikhailovna, and Zinaida Mikhailovna.  Princess Cantacuzène remained in St. Petersburg during World War I in which Prince Cantacuzène served as aide-de-camp and later Major-General, and finally General, in the service of Tsar Nicholas II.  He served with distinction and was wounded in battle in 1914; as commander of the South Russia Cossacks, in 1915 he led 15,000 men in what has been called the last great cavalry charge against a fortified position in military history.  The family left Russia in the aftermath of the Russian Revolution; in 1917, they escaped from Petrograd with her jewels sewn into her clothing, and escaped via Finland to the United States. The couple moved to Washington, D.C. and attempted to attract support for a counter-revolution in Russia, but after news of the execution of the former Tsar and of his brother, Grand Duke Michael Alexandrovich of Russia, ended their activism.  The couple relocated to Sarasota, Florida, joining the firm founded by her aunt Bertha Palmer.

Prince and Princess Cantacuzène divorced on 27 October 1934, after which Mrs. Julia Grant Cantacuzène, having re-established her U.S. citizenship and reverted to non-aristocratic title and style, moved back to her native Washington, D.C.

Children
 Prince Mikhail Mikhailovitch Cantacuzène, Count Spéransky (b. 21 July 1900, St. Petersburg, d. 26 December 1972), married first to Clarissa Curtis, daughter of Thomas Pelham Curtis and Frances Kellogg Small, second to Florence Bushnell Carr, and third to Florence Clarke Hall.  He had a son and a daughter from his first marriage.
 Princess Barbara Mikhailovna Cantacuzène, Countess Spiransky (b. 27 March 1904, St. Petersburg, d. 7 January 1991) married firstly Bruce Smith, secondly William Durrell Siebern. She was known as Bertha. She had a son by her first husband, named Bruce Smith, as well.
 Princess Zinaida Mikhailovna Cantacuzène, Countess Spéransky (b. 17 November 1908, St. Petersburg, d. 17 September 1980) married Sir John Coldbrook Hanbury-Williams, son of Major-General Sir John Hanbury-Williams and Annie Emily Reiss. She was known as Ida. She had three children, a son and two daughters.
She was survived, at her death, by her daughters, six grandchildren, 22 great-grandchildren, and three great-great-grandchildren.

Writing career
Cantacuzène was the author of numerous articles which appeared in The New York Times, The Saturday Evening Post, and Woman's Home Companion Her books included, "Russian People; Revolutionary Recollections," (1919) "Revolutionary Days; Recollections of Romanoffs and Bolsheviki, 1914–1917," (1920)  and "My Life Here and There." (1922) All of her books were published in the U.S. by Charles Scribner's Sons, and in London by the firm of Chapman & Hall.  "Revolutionary Days" (with selections from "My Life Here and There") was republished in December 1999 by R.R. Donnelley & Sons Company.

Later life
She was a founder of the Sulgrave Club, where she lunched regularly until 1970.  She was active in the White Russian community in Washington.  She went blind before she turned 80 years old, but regained partial eyesight two weeks before she turned 90. She died in Washington on October 4, 1975, at the age of 99, and is buried at the National Cathedral.

Books
Revolutionary Days: Recollections of Romanoffs and Bolsheviki, 1914-1917, published 1919, Charles Scribner's Sons
Russian People, Revolutionary Recollections, published 1920, Charles Scribner's Sons
My Life Here and There, published 1922, Charles Scribner's Sons

Ancestry

References

Further reading
 Croft, Lee B., Ashleigh Albrecht, Emily Cluff, and Erica Resmer.  Entry on Grigorii L'vovich Kantakuzen (pp. 126–131) in Ambassadors: U.S.-to-Russia/Russia-to-U.S. Capstone Publications. 2010. . Treats genealogy of Kantakuzen Princely line from Russian sources and from Princess Julia's personal writings.

External links
 "The Ancestors of Prince Rodion Cantacuzene," Michael K. Smith, https://web.archive.org/web/20070626152805/http://book-smith.tripod.com/dracula.html, 2001.

1876 births
1975 deaths
Russian nobility
Converts to Eastern Orthodoxy from Anglicanism
Writers from Washington, D.C.
American emigrants to the Russian Empire
White Russian emigrants to the United States
Ulysses S. Grant
Grant family
People included in New York Society's Four Hundred
Russian women of World War I
Russian princesses by marriage
Julia
American women historians
Women writers from the Russian Empire
20th-century American women writers
Daughters of the American Revolution people
Historians from New York (state)
Burials at Washington National Cathedral